Needmore is an unincorporated community in Boyle County, Kentucky, United States.

References

Unincorporated communities in Boyle County, Kentucky
Unincorporated communities in Kentucky